Pietro di Giampietro (born 1709 – active after 1750) was an Italian painter of the late-Baroque period in Basilicata.

He was born in Brienza. His older brother, Leonardo, was also a painter. Pietro is known for his fresco decoration (1743–1744) of the church of San Francesco in San Martino d'Agri. His brother painted a Deposition once found in the former convent dell'Annunziata in Brienza, as well as frescoes in the church of Santa Maria degli Angeli in that town. Pietro painted frescoes in the convent dell'Annunziata (1740) in Brienza. He also painted a Life of St Joseph and Christ (1750) for the chiesa di San Giuseppe, Brienza. In the parish church of Laurenzana he painted a polyptych mural and decorated the ceiling with Evangelists and Doctors of the Church. In Cirigliano, in the Formica Chapel, he painted a Via Crucis.

References

18th-century Italian painters
Italian male painters
1709 births
Year of death unknown
Italian Baroque painters
18th-century Italian male artists